The 31st Airlift Squadron is an inactive United States Air Force unit.  Its last was assigned to the 436th Operations Group, Air Mobility Command, stationed at Dover Air Force Base, Delaware.  It was inactivated on 14 January 1994.

History
First activated as a ferrying unit during World War II.  Served on the North Atlantic Ferrying Route until disbanded in 1943 and replaced by Station 19, North Atlantic Wing, Air Transport Command in a general reorganization of Air Transport Command.

Reactivated in 1952 as a C-124 Globemaster II heavy airlift squadron.  Flew worldwide very long range strategic airlift missions for Military Air Transport Service (Later Military Airlift Command) on a global scale, inactivated in 1969 with the retirement of the C-124.   Reactivated in 1989 as a C-5 Galaxy strategic airlift squadron when the C-5B began production.  Flew global transport missions of equipment and personnel until being inactivated after the end of the Cold War.

Lineage
 Constituted as the 31st Ferrying Squadron c. 9 July 1942
 Activated on 25 July 1942
 Redesignated 31st Transport Squadron c. 24 March 1943
 Disbanded on 1 September 1943
 Reconstituted as the 31st Air Transport Squadron, Heavy on 20 June 1952
 Activated on 20 July 1952
 Redesignated 31st Troop Carrier Squadron, Heavy on 1 June 1965
 Redesignated 31st Military Airlift Squadron on 8 January 1966
 Inactivated on 8 April 1969
 Reactivated on 1 October 1989
 Redesignated as: 31st Airlift Squadron''' on 1 December 1991
 Inactivated on 14 January 1994

Assignments
 8th Ferrying Group (later 8th Transport Group), 25 July 1942 – 1 September 1943
 1600th Air Transport Group, 20 July 1952
 1607th Air Transport Wing, 1 July 1955
 436th Military Airlift Wing, 8 January 1966 – 1 April 1969
 436th Military Airlift Wing, 1 October 1989
 436th Operations Group, 1 December 1991 – 14 January 1994

Stations
 Presque Isle Army Air Field, Maine, 25 July 1942
 Meeks Field, Iceland, August 1942 – 1 September 1943
 Westover Air Force Base, Massachusetts, 20 July 1952
 Dover Air Force Base, Delaware, 19 June 1955 – 1 April 1969
 Dover Air Force Base, Delaware, 1 October 1989 – 14 January 1994

Aircraft
 C-124 Globemaster II, 1952–1966, 1966–1969
 C-5 Galaxy, 1989–1994

References

Notes

Bibliography

 
 
 

031
031